KGGM (93.9 FM, "Southern Gospel Music") is a radio station broadcasting a southern gospel music format. Licensed to Delhi, Louisiana, United States, the station is currently owned by Kenneth W. Diebel.

History
The Federal Communications Commission issued a construction permit for the station to K.T. Enterprises, Inc. on August 7, 1987. The station was assigned the call sign KKRP on August 26, 1987, and was issued its license to cover on March 6, 1992. On June 1, 1994, the station changed its call sign to the current KGGM. On August 6, 2003, K.T. Enterprises, Inc. assigned the station's license to the current owner, Kenneth W. Diebel, for $120,000.

References

External links

Southern Gospel radio stations in the United States
Radio stations established in 1992
Christian radio stations in Louisiana